Nicolas Rossard (born 23 May 1990) is a French former professional volleyball player. As a member of his national team, he won the 2015 European Championship and the 2017 World League.

Personal life
His cousins, Quentin and Thibault are also volleyball players, as was their grandfather Jacques Rossard.

Honours

Clubs
 National championships
 2015/2016  French Championship, with Arago de Sète
 2016/2017  French Championship, with Spacer's de Toulouse
 2017/2018  German Championship, with Berlin Recycling Volleys

Youth national team
 2008  CEV U20 European Championship

External links

 
 Player profile at PlusLiga.pl 
 Player profile at Volleybox.net

1990 births
Living people
Sportspeople from Nîmes
French men's volleyball players
Volleyball players at the 2015 European Games
European Games competitors for France
French expatriate sportspeople in Poland
Expatriate volleyball players in Poland
French expatriate sportspeople in Germany
Expatriate volleyball players in Germany
Liberos